An International Marriage is a 1916 American silent comedy film directed by Frank Lloyd and written by George Broadhurst. The film stars Rita Jolivet, Marc Robbins, Elliott Dexter, Grace Carlyle, Olive White, and Courtenay Foote. The film was released on July 23, 1916, by Paramount Pictures.

Plot
The story revolves around a Florence Brent (Rita Jolivet) who is an American heiress who wishes to marry a Duke in Europe. The father of the duke wants her to have a title before marriage however, so she quickly marries the Duke's friend who is a Count with plans to quickly divorce him and retain the title. After the marriage though, she finds out that the Duke is already married. After all that, Florence's sweetheart arrives from America with a pistol and tells the Count he wants to marry her. She decides to go off with her sweetheart, and moves back to New York with him.

Cast 
Rita Jolivet as Florence Brent
Marc Robbins as Bennington Brent
Elliott Dexter as John Oglesby
Grace Carlyle as Eleanor Williamson 
Olive White as Mrs. Williamson (*aka Mrs. William Farnum)
Courtenay Foote as Duke of Burritz
Page Peters as Count Janefski
Herbert Standing as Archduke Ferdinand
Adelaide Woods as Agnes Sotherton
Jean Woodbury as The Archduchess

Preservation status
It exists in the Library of Congress collection, Packard Campus for Audio-Visual Conservation.

References

External links 

 

1916 films
1910s English-language films
Silent American comedy films
1916 comedy films
Paramount Pictures films
Films directed by Frank Lloyd
American black-and-white films
American silent feature films
Surviving American silent films
1910s American films